Jan Harting was an Indonesian football defender who played for the Dutch East Indies in the 1938 FIFA World Cup. He also played for HBS Soerabaja.

References

External links
 

Indonesian footballers
Indonesia international footballers
Association football defenders
1938 FIFA World Cup players
Year of birth missing